Atlas Shrugged Part III: Who Is John Galt? is a 2014 American science fiction-drama film based on the philosopher Ayn Rand's 1957 novel Atlas Shrugged. It is the third installment in the Atlas Shrugged film series and the sequel to the 2012 film Atlas Shrugged: Part II, continuing the story where its predecessor left off. The release, originally set for July 4, occurred on September 12, 2014. The film used a completely different cast and crew than the second film, which itself used a completely different cast from the first film. Directed by J. James Manera, it stars Laura Regan, Kristoffer Polaha, and Joaquim de Almeida.

Plot
The owner of the 20th-century Motor Company has died and his children have taken over, with a new plan to operate the company: that everyone work as hard as he can, but that salaries be "based on need". A lab engineer named John Galt objects and announces, "I'll stop the motor of the world."

Twelve years later, the economy of the United States spirals downward. Shortages have grounded airlines and returned the railroads to dominance; over-regulation has led to financial disaster. Galt seems to be behind the disappearances of corporate executives and other experts. The latest disappearance is that of Dagny Taggart, the executive officer of the largest railroad company, Taggart Transcontinental. She had chased Galt in a private plane and crashed hers.

Dagny has reached Galt's Gulch, and Galt himself rescues her from the crashed plane. She meets several "disappeared" achievers, such as banker Midas Mulligan, who say they quit after coming to believe that government was enslaving them. On the outside, the government develops a classified new weapon called "Project F" and nationalizes the railroads, including Taggart Transcontinental.

The public grows increasingly frustrated with the central planning, comes to view Galt as the solution, and holds rallies calling for him to reform the government. Thompson, the Head of State, offers Galt a job in the government, but Galt rebuffs the offer. Later, the government tortures Galt using the power of "Project F". However, others from the Gulch arrive to free him and they escape back to their refuge as the power grid around New York City begins to collapse.

Cast
 Laura Regan as Dagny Taggart
 Kristoffer Polaha as John Galt
 Joaquim de Almeida as Francisco d'Anconia
 Eric Allan Kramer as Ragnar Danneskjöld
 Tony Denison as Cuffy Meigs
 Rob Morrow as Henry "Hank" Rearden
 Larry Cedar as Dr. Floyd Ferris
 Greg Germann as James Taggart
 Jen Nikolaisen as Cherryl Taggart (née Brooks)
 Louis Herthum as Wesley Mouch
 Dominic Daniel as Eddie Willers
 Peter Mackenzie as Head of State Thompson
 Mark Moses as Midas Mulligan
 Lew Temple as Ellis Wyatt
 Stephen Tobolowsky as Dr. Hugh Akston
 Neil Dickson as Dr. Robert Stadler
 Ron Paul, Glenn Beck, and Sean Hannity as themselves

Production

Development
In an interview with Bill Frezza of Forbes, the producer John Aglialoro mentioned that the film would include a short dialogue between the heroine Dagny Taggart and a priest, a character which he said Rand struggled with and ultimately cut out of the original book. This scene did not appear in the final cut.

A month prior to the release of Part I, Aglialoro suggested that Part III might be made into a musical. In 2013 he promised to create "something closer to the book", and predicted that critics would pan the film. In a YouTube promotional piece where organizers discussed the film, he asserted that it was vital for the team to have a director who is professional, collaborative, and knows Rand's work: "I don't care if I've got to fire five directors — that's fine. We're going to get it right."

The film was directed by J. James Manera, whose experience included directing a documentary in 2010 and a 1996 episode of the television show Nash Bridges. The cinematographer was Gale Tattersall.

Writing
David Kelley, founder of The Atlas Society and an expert on the philosophical themes of Atlas Shrugged, consulted on the script, as he did for Parts I and II.

Casting
As with the second part, a new set of actors was cast to play the major characters. Former Congressman and Presidential candidate Ron Paul, and network commentators Glenn Beck and Sean Hannity, played themselves giving responses to John Galt's speech.

Filming
The trade press reported that filming began in January 2014, after the film posted on Facebook that its target start date was Autumn 2013. The budget was partially funded by a Kickstarter campaign that raised $446,907 against a goal of $250,000.

Release

Marketing
A sneak preview was shown at the Anthem Film Festival in Las Vegas, Nevada in July 2014.

Box office
The film opened on September 12, 2014 on 242 screens and grossed $461,179 during its opening weekend. Total gross was $851,690 against a budget of $5,000,000.

Reception
The film was universally panned, holding a 0% on Rotten Tomatoes, based on 10 reviews for an average rating of 1.4/10. On Metacritic, the film has a 9/100 rating based on 7 critics, indicating "overwhelming dislike". Alan Scherstuhl of The Village Voice wrote: "Rand's parable is meant to showcase just how much our world needs the best of us, but this adaptation only does so accidentally – by revealing what movies would be like if none of the best of us worked on them."

Writing for The Austin Chronicle, Louis Black said: "In 1949, when Warner Bros. filmed The Fountainhead, Rand threatened to burn down the studio if they compromised her novel. I'd like to think that if she were alive she'd be looking for lighter fluid for this one."

Atlas Shrugged: Part III was nominated for Worst Prequel, Remake, Rip-off or Sequel at the 35th Golden Raspberry Awards.

References

External links
 
 
 
 

2014 films
2014 independent films
2010s mystery thriller films
2010s science fiction films
2014 thriller drama films
American business films
American thriller drama films
American mystery films
American political thriller films
American science fiction films
American dystopian films
Films about businesspeople
Films scored by Elia Cmíral
Films based on American novels
Films based on works by Ayn Rand
Films based on science fiction novels
American independent films
Kickstarter-funded films
2014 drama films
2010s English-language films
2010s American films